Camden East/Varty Lake Aerodrome  is a registered aerodrome located  north northeast of Camden East, Ontario, Canada.

References

Registered aerodromes in Ontario